Heads You Lose is a 1941 crime mystery novel by the British writer Christianna Brand. It was her second novel following her successful debut Death in High Heels and the first to feature Inspector Cockrill of the Kent Police Force.

Synopsis
Cockrill is called in to a country house in wartime Britain where two murders are committed amongst several guests of the local squire.

References

Bibliography
 Walton, Samantha. Guilty But Insane: Mind and Law in Golden Age Detective Fiction. Oxford University Press, 2015.

1941 British novels
Novels by Christianna Brand
British crime novels
Novels set in England
British detective novels
The Bodley Head books